Omosarotes foxi is a species of beetle in the family Cerambycidae. It was described by Lane in 1973. It is known from Brazil.

References

Cyrtinini
Beetles described in 1973